Paisa Vasool is a 2017 Indian Telugu-language action comedy film, produced by V. Anand Prasad under Bhavya Creations banner and directed by Puri Jagannadh. It stars Nandamuri Balakrishna, Shriya Saran, Musskan Sethi and Vikramjeet Virk. music composed by Anup Rubens. The film marks Nandamuri Balakrishna's 101st film on the big screen, and he has for the first time singing a special song in this film with his own voice.

Plot
Bob Marley, a mafia don operating from Portugal, controls Hyderabad remotely using his agents. Unable to bear his atrocities, India's premier intelligence agency RAW Chief looks for a self-proclaimed criminal through a local IPS officer named ACP Kiranmayi. She finds a gangster named Theda Singh, who had just then been released from Tihar Jail.

Meanwhile, Singh becomes neighbor to a beautiful girl named Harika, who is in search of her missing sister Sarika, last seen in Portugal. Harika lodges a complaint regarding this with the authorities, leading to her safety being threatened by Bob Marley's associates in Hyderabad. Theda Singh always protects her from them, so she starts falling for him. Suddenly, the RAW authorities and Policemen are in for a shock when they realize that Theda Singh is not what he appears to be, he had recently landed from Portugal. Harika also learns that Sarika was murdered in Portugal and that the killer is none other than Singh.

The Indian Police Authority arrests Singh. In the interrogation, he reveals the flashback. Theda Singh, a cab driver in Portugal, was no less than a rogue who participated in petty smuggling activities. He once met Sarika as a passenger, who was a journalist and had been doing a sting operation on Bob Marley. Both of them fell in love. Bob Marley learned of Sarika's operation which would have divulged secrets of many Indian politicians and professionals, so they try to kill her. Theda Singh arrives in time to save her. This is where the real suspense is revealed, that Theda Singh is in fact, a RAW officer named Balakrishna Nandamuri and he has been granted the license to kill, having been tasked to kill Bob Marley. In that attack, Sarika is grievously injured. When Balakrishna was trying to get a shot at Bob Marley, higher authorities command him to leave him and reluctantly complies. Unfortunately, Sarika died in his lap, due to a gunshot from Bob; before dying, she asks Bala to take care of her family. Depressed and hurt, filled with hatred for his department, he creates an image that he has died due to an injury in the crossfire.

Back in the present, the RAW Chief realising Theda Singh's true identity, starts from his office to meet him and identify him in person. But he is attacked by assassins, since he is the only person knowing the true identity of Balakrishna. Upon consultation by the Police, RAW Authorities reveal that, to find the truth, the only way is to conduct a re-interview of Balakrishna, which he successfully completes and rejoins duty. Meanwhile, the RAW chief recovers and orders Balakrishna to kill Bob Marley. But, to his surprise, Balakrishna reveals that he already killed him on the next day of Sarika's death. But the Indian politicians and gangsters in Marley's payroll created an image that he is alive, to continue their illegal activities. And he eliminates them too. At last, he goes to the next mission.

Cast
Nandamuri Balakrishna as Theda Singh / RAW Agent 'Bala'
Shriya Saran as Sarika
Musskan Sethi as Harika 
Vikramjeet Virk as Bob Marley
Kyra Dutt as ACP Kiranmayi
Kabir Bedi as Raw Chief
Ali as Theda Singh's friend
Pavitra Lokesh as Sarika and Harika's mother
Prudhviraj as Advocate Pruthviraj
Amit Tiwari as Sunny
Srikanth Iyyengar as Minister
Mukhtar Khan as Police Officer 
Alok Jain as Pathan
Temper Vamsi as Bob Marley's henchman

Soundtrack

Music composed by Anup Rubens. Music released by ADITYA Music Company.

Production
In February 2017, director Puri Jagannath announced on Twitter that he would be directing Nandamuri Balakrishna's 101st film in his next directorial venture to be bankrolled by Bhavya Creations. The muhurtham shot took place on 9 March 2017 in Hyderabad amidst much fanfare. S. S. Rajamouli, Boyapati Srinu, Krish and other dignitaries attended the muhurat ceremony. While Rajamouli gave the clap, Boyapati directed the first shot. The first look of the movie along with the title was launched on 9 June 2017 on the eve of Balakrishna's birthday. On 27 August 2017, as a part of the film promotion Puri Jagannadh released a track called "Jai Balayya" composed by Sandeep Chowta and sung by Sujay Harthi. N.T.Rama Rao's old song "Kanti Choopu Cheptondi" from the movie Jeevitha Chakram was remixed in the film.

Reception

Critical response 
Siddhartha of Mirchi9 wrote about the movie "Paisa Vasool is a very ordinary movie story wise. The film looks like a combination of past Puri Jagannadh films with best bits taken from each of them." He also added that "Overall, the movie is just an average fare if one is a fan of the star (Balakrishna), for others, it is nothing unmissable."

References

External links 

2017 films
Indian action comedy films
Films scored by Anoop Rubens
Films directed by Puri Jagannadh
Films shot in Portugal
Films shot in Hyderabad, India
2010s Telugu-language films
2017 action comedy films